Key Tower is a skyscraper on Public Square in downtown Cleveland, Ohio. Designed by architect César Pelli, it is the tallest building in the state of Ohio, the 39th-tallest in the United States, and the 165th-tallest in the world. The tower contains about 1.5 million square feet (139,355 m²) of office space.

Key Tower's anchor tenant is KeyCorp, a major regional financial services firm.  In 2014 the law firm of BakerHostetler announced that it would move its headquarters to the building, taking up several floors being vacated by KeyCorp. The international law firm Squire Patton Boggs is headquartered here and a major tenant. It is also headquarters to Dan T. Moore Companies, located on the 27th floor. Key Tower is connected to the Marriott at Key Center, built in conjunction with the tower, and the older Society for Savings Building. It is the tallest building between Philadelphia and Chicago. It is also the tallest building in the Midwest United States outside of Chicago.

In October 2008, Wells Real Estate Funds purchased Key Center, including Key Tower, Marriott at Key Center, Society for Savings Building, and the underground Memorial Plaza Garage. Key Tower was subsequently acquired by The Millennia Companies in 2017. The purchase price was $267.5 million.

History

It was originally built as the Society Center and was the headquarters for Cleveland-based Society Corporation. Society had recently acquired AmeriTrust and canceled AmeriTrust's plans for an even taller (61-story) building on Public Square. Its opening ended the Terminal Tower's 60-year reign as the tallest building in Ohio.

It was renamed Key Tower after Society merged with KeyCorp and took the KeyCorp name. Indeed, it was decided to make Cleveland the headquarters for the new KeyCorp because it was felt the then-Society Center was more commensurate with the merged bank's status as a major bank. Pelli originally intended its design for the Norwest Center in Minneapolis, but a late change to the site led to Pelli designing a new tower for it.

Key Tower was developed by the Richard E. Jacobs Group.

When Society Center was completed in 1991 by Turner Construction, it became the tallest building between Chicago and New York City.  The  Comcast Center in Philadelphia assumed this distinction in 2007. The Chamber of Commerce Building stood on the tower's site from 1898 to 1955.

F-111, James Rosenquist's large pop art painting, hung in the tower's lobby until building owner Richard Jacobs sold it to the Museum of Modern Art in 1996. He replaced it in 1998 with Songs for Sale, a mural by artist David Salle. Each sign weighs .

A smaller-scale building was proposed by Pelli to be built in Hartford, Connecticut, during the late 1980s, but the plan was ultimately canceled.

See also
List of tallest buildings by U.S. state
List of tallest buildings in Cleveland
List of tallest buildings in the United States

References

External links

 Key Tower on CTBUH Skyscraper Center
Images and architectural information

César Pelli buildings
Skyscraper office buildings in Cleveland
1991 establishments in Ohio
Office buildings completed in 1991
Downtown Cleveland